Sylvester is a lunar impact crater that is located near the north pole of the Moon, along the northern limb in the libration zone. It lies just to the south-southeast of the craters Grignard and Hermite; the latter of which is within one crater diameter of the pole. South of Sylvester is Pascal. Due to its location, Sylvester receives sunlight at only a low angle.

This crater is generally circular, with a sharp-edged rim that has received only a moderate amount of wear. There are no craters of note along the rim, although Sylvester intrudes into a smaller, shallow-rimmed crater to the southeast. The interior floor is relatively flat, but punctuated by several tiny craters. At the midpoint is a small central peak.

Satellite craters
By convention these features are identified on lunar maps by placing the letter on the side of the crater midpoint that is closest to Sylvester.

External links
 LAC-1 area - Map of northern lunar pole

References

 
 
 
 
 
 
 
 
 
 
 
 

Impact craters on the Moon